Leucadendron macowanii, the acacia-leaf conebush, is a flower-bearing shrub that belongs to the genus Leucadendron and forms part of the fynbos. The plant is native to the Western Cape, South Africa.

Description
Fire destroys the plant but the seeds survive. The seeds are stored in a toll on the female plant and are released where they fall to the ground and are possibly spread by the wind. The plant is unisexual and there are male and female plant and propagate by wind pollination.

Distribution and habitat
The plant it is found in the Cape Peninsula at Smitswinkel Bay and Wynberg.

References

External links
Threatened Species Programme | SANBI Red List of South African Plants
Leucadendron macowanii E.Phillips
Leucadendron macowanii (Acacia-leaf conebush)
Acacia Conebush

macowanii